Fort Greely is a census-designated place (CDP) in Southeast Fairbanks Census Area, Alaska, United States. It is home to the Fort Greely military installation. At the 2010 census the population was 539, up from 461 in 2000.

Geography
Fort Greely is located at  (63.905016, -145.554566).

Army Nuclear Power Program
Because of its remote location, Fort Greely was chosen as one of the first US military posts to have a compact, nuclear power reactor to generate heat and electricity, under the auspices of the Army Nuclear Power Program. A nuclear power plant, designated the SM-1A was flown in and installed between 1960–62, and was based on the Army's first prototype reactor, the SM-1 at Fort Belvoir, Virginia. SM-1A pressurized-water reactor reached initial criticality on 13 March 1962, and was shut down in 1972: the reactor core was removed and sent to the Savannah River nuclear site.

Demographics

Fort Greely first appeared as an unincorporated military installation on the 1970 U.S. Census. It was made a census-designated place (CDP) in 1980.

As of the census of 2000, there were 461 people, 126 households, and 112 families residing in the CDP.  The population density was 2.7/sq mi (1.1/km2).  There were 354 housing units at an average density of 2.1/sq mi (0.8/km2).  The racial makeup of the CDP was 65.73% White, 19.74% Black or African American, 1.30% Native American, 1.30% Asian, 1.95% Pacific Islander, 3.69% from other races, and 6.29% from two or more races.  15.40% of the population were Hispanic or Latino of any race.

Of the 126 households, 73.8% had children under the age of 18 living with them, 80.2% were married couples living together, 7.1% had a female householder with no husband present, and 11.1% were non-families. 11.1% of all households were made up of individuals, and none had someone living alone who was 65 years of age or older.  The average household size was 3.25 and the average family size was 3.53.

In the CDP, the population was spread out, with 38.6% under the age of 18, 16.1% from 18 to 24, 43.4% from 25 to 44, 2.0% from 45 to 64, .  The median age was 23 years. For every 100 females, there were 115.4 males.  For every 100 females age 18 and over, there were 119.4 males.

The median income for a household in the CDP was $33,750, and the median income for a family was $32,969. Males had a median income of $26,544 versus $21,375 for females. The per capita income for the CDP was $12,368.  About 11.6% of families and 10.4% of the population were below the poverty line, including 10.9% of those under age 18 and none of those age 65 or over.

Climate
As it is not near the ocean, this area is drier than coastal Alaska and experiences seasonal extremes typical of subarctic areas.  The annual precipitation is only 12 inches (305 mm), including 37 inches (94 cm) of snow. The average low temperature in January is −11 °F (−23 °C). The average high during July is +69 °F (+20 °C). Temperature extremes have been recorded from −63 °F to +92 °F (−53 °C to +33 °C).

Fort Greely is mostly sunny in the summer and split between clear and overcast days in the winter. On clear winter nights, the aurora borealis can often be seen dancing in the sky.  Like all subarctic regions, the months from May to July in the summer have no night, only a twilight during the night hours. The months of November to January have little daylight.

See also
 Allen Army Airfield

Sources and references

"Fort Greely". Encyclopedia Astronautica. Retrieved July 18, 2006.
"Fort Greely". Fort Greely report May 2000. Retrieved May 27, 2012.

External links
 Fort Greely Homepage (official site)
 U.S. Army Cold Regions Test Center

Census-designated places in Southeast Fairbanks Census Area, Alaska
Census-designated places in Alaska
Census-designated places in Unorganized Borough, Alaska